Vasek Pospisil was the defending champion but lost the final 6–7(6–8), 4–6 to quailificant Rik de Voest.

Seeds

Draw

Finals

Top half

Bottom half

References
 Main Draw
 Qualifying Draw

Challenger Banque Nationale de Rimouski
Challenger de Drummondville